Man in Motion may refer to:

 Man in Motion (Night Ranger album), 1988
 Man in Motion (Warren Haynes album), 2011
 Man-in-motion, an American football term
 Man in Motion World Tour, an around-the-world fundraising wheelchair journey by Rick Hansen
 "St. Elmo's Fire (Man in Motion)", a 1985 song by John Parr